Dioungani  is a village and commune of the Cercle of Koro in the Mopti Region of Mali. Jamsay Dogon is spoken in the commune.

References

External links
.

Communes of Mopti Region